Morten Lindberg (born 15 August 1970 in Skien, Norway) is a Norwegian sound engineer and music producer, specialising in classical music productions. As a producer and engineer, he held the record for most Grammy nominations without a win, with twenty-eight through 2019, until 2020 when he won his first Grammy.

Lindberg started his career in 1992 with his production company Lindberg Lyd, followed by the record label 2L which he created with Wolfgang Plagge and Jorn Simenstad in 2001. The company specialises in high quality recordings of Nordic classical music, often recorded in concert halls, churches, etc.

From 2006, the 2L record label has received 28 Grammy nominations, including fifteen (as of 2018) for Mr Lindberg in the Best Surround Sound Album category alone. Proving his dominance in this category, he received three nominations in a field of five at the 58th Grammy Awards in 2016. Lindberg has also been nominated in other categories, such as Best Choral Performance and Best Engineered Album, Classical.

He finally won his first Grammy Award in 2020 for Best Immersive Audio Album. Up to and including the 64th Grammy Awards (to be presented on 31 January 2022), Lindberg has received 31 nominations with one win.

He usually works with Norwegian and other Scandinavian ensembles and soloists, such as the Trondheim Soloists, Ensemble 96, Uranienborg Vokalensemble, and Vladimir Ashkenazy.

Awards and nominations

Grammy Awards

!
|-
| 2007
| Immortal Nystedt
|  rowspan="2"|Best Surround Sound Album
| 
| rowspan="28"|
|-
| rowspan="2"|2009
| rowspan="2"|Divertimenti
| 
|-
| Best Engineered Album, Classical
| 
|-
| rowspan="2"|2010
| Flute Mystery
| rowspan="5"|Best Surround Sound Album
| 
|-
| Kleiberg: Treble & Bass
| 
|-
| 2011
| Trondheimsolistene – In Folk Style
| 
|-
| 2012
| Kind
| 
|-
| rowspan="2"|2013
| Quiet Winter Night
| 
|-
| Souvenir
| rowspan="3"|Best Engineered Album, Classical
| 
|-
| rowspan="3"|2014
| Hymn to the Virgin
| 
|-
| La Voie Triomphale
| 
|-
| Kleiberg: David and Bathsheba
| Best Opera Recording
| 
|-
| rowspan="2"|2015
| Himself
| Producer of the Year, Classical
| 
|-
| Beppe: Remote Galaxy
| rowspan="6"|Best Surround Sound Album
| 
|-
| rowspan="3"|2016
| Amdahl: Astrognosia & Aesop
| 
|-
| Magnificat
| 
|-
| Spes
| 
|-
| rowspan="3"|2017
| Maja S.K. Ratkje: And Sing...
|
|-
| rowspan="2"|Reflections
|
|-
| Best Engineered Album, Classical
|
|-
| rowspan="4"|2018
| rowspan="2"|Kleiberg: Mass for Modern Man
| Best Surround Sound Album
| 
|-
| Best Engineered Album, Classical
| 
|-
| Himself
| Producer of the Year, Classical
| 
|-
| So Is My Love
| Best Surround Sound Album
| 
|-
| rowspan="2"|2019
| Folketoner
| rowspan="3"|Best Immersive Audio Album
| 
|-
| Sommerro: Ujamaa & The Iceberg
| 
|-
| rowspan="2"|2020
| Lux
| 
|-
| Himself
| Producer of the Year, Classical
| 
|-

References

External links

1970 births
Living people
Norwegian record producers
Norwegian audio engineers
Classical music producers
Immersive audio engineers